The following offices were up for election in the United States State of New Jersey in the general election on November 3, 2009:

Two statewide offices – Governor of New Jersey and Lieutenant Governor of New Jersey – for four-year terms.
All 80 seats in the New Jersey General Assembly, the lower house in the New Jersey Legislature – for two-year terms
Various county and local offices throughout the state

Persons 18 years or older on the general election date (born on or before November 3, 1991) were eligible to register and vote in the general election.

Governor

Democratic Governor Jon Corzine was running for a second term and was being challenged by Republican Chris Christie, Independent Christopher Daggett, and nine others (not including write-in candidates).  Christie won the election with about 49 percent of the vote, to 45 percent for Corzine and 6 percent for Daggett.  Christie assumed office on January 20, 2010.

This was the first election to fill the newly created office of lieutenant governor. The candidates for governor and lieutenant governor were joined together as a single choice, so that voters did not have the opportunity to split the ticket.  Kim Guadagno, Christie's running mate, became New Jersey's first lieutenant governor.

General Election Candidates

Major candidates
The following three candidates all qualified to appear, and did appear, in the debates.
Christopher J. Christie, Republican of Mendham Township – former United States Attorney for the District of New Jersey (2001–2008) and former Morris County Freeholder (1995–1998)
Jon S. Corzine, Democrat of Hoboken – incumbent Governor (serving since 2006) and former United States Senator (2001–2006)
Christopher Daggett, Independent of Basking Ridge – former New Jersey Commissioner of Environmental Protection (1988–1989), Environmental Protection Agency regional administrator (1984–1988), and Deputy Chief of Staff to the Governor (1982–1984)

Other candidates
Nine other candidates qualified to appear on the ballot as independents or third-party nominees but did not raise enough money to qualify for the debates. These include Libertarian Kenneth Kaplan, the Socialist Party USA's Greg Pason, and the following independents: Jason Cullen, Joshua Leinsdorf, Alvin Lindsay, David R. Meiswinkle, Kostas Petris, Gary T. Steele and Gary Stein. At least five others, including popular New Jersey comedian Uncle Floyd, announced that they would run write-in campaigns.

Primary Election Candidates
The following candidates were defeated by Jon Corzine in the Democratic primary:
Roger Bacon, Democrat of Phillipsburg – unsuccessful candidate for the United States House of Representatives in New Jersey's 5th congressional district in 2008
Carl Bergmanson, Democrat of Glen Ridge – former Mayor of Glen Ridge (2004–2008)
Jeff Boss, Democrat of Guttenberg – unsuccessful candidate for United States Senate in 2008

The following candidates were defeated by Chris Christie in the Republican primary:
Steve Lonegan, Republican of Bogota – former Mayor of Bogota (1995–2007)
Rick Merkt, Republican of Mendham Township – New Jersey General Assemblyman (serving since 1998)

The following Republican Primary candidates were removed from the ballot:
David Brown, Republican of South Brunswick
Christian Keller, Republican of Leesburg – New Jersey Department of Corrections employee
Brian D. Levine, Republican of Franklin Township – Mayor of Franklin Township (serving since 2005)

Republican primary
Former U.S. Attorney Christopher J. Christie had long been considered the front-runner for the Republican nomination. He was heavily favored by the party establishment and had won the endorsement and county line of all county GOP organizations.
Christie's chief opponent in the primary was former Bogota mayor Steve Lonegan, known for his very right-wing positions and vocal opposition to the Corzine administration; another staunch conservative, General Assemblyman Rick Merkt was also on the ballot.
David Brown, Christian Keller, and Franklin Township mayor Brian D. Levine also filed to run in the Republican primary, but their petitions were challenged by Lonegan and they were disqualified from the ballot when administrative judges ruled that their nominating petitions failed to meet the threshold of 1,000 valid signatures.
Upon leaving the race, Brown and Levine endorsed Christie.

Christie and Lonegan attacked each other relentlessly throughout the primary campaign through mailers and robocalls, with each seeking to undermine the other by drawing the public's attention to scandals involving the other.  Lonegan proposed ending the state's progressive income tax system and replacing it with a 2.9% flat tax for all New Jerseyans. Christie strongly opposed this proposal, arguing that Lonegan's proposal would amount to a tax increase for most New Jerseyans. Christie instead proposed cutting taxes "across the board," although he refused to say by how much. There were two televised debates, which excluded Merkt, and two radio debates, which included him.  Ultimately, Christie was able to win the primary with 55% of the vote to Lonegan's 42% and Merkt's 3%.

Democratic primary
Although polls indicated his vulnerability in the general election, Governor Jon S. Corzine was heavily favored to win the Democratic primary over his three little-known challengers.  The only one of those to have held elected office, former Glen Ridge mayor Carl Bergmanson, was running on a platform of fiscal discipline, social liberalism, and government reform; he had received the support of the Citizens Against Tolls website. In the primary, Corzine won renomination with 77% of the vote, while Bergmanson, his closest competitor, received about 9%.

General election
Since the primaries, polls have consistently showed Christie leading Corzine, sometimes by double digits. The election became a three-way race on July 7, when independent candidate Christopher Daggett announced that he had raised enough money to qualify for public funds and to qualify for participation in the debates. On July 20, Christie selected Kim Guadagno as his running mate. On July 24, Corzine announced in an e-mail to his supporters that he had selected Loretta Weinberg as his running mate. On July 27, Daggett announced that he had selected longtime Kean University professor and administrator Frank J. Esposito as his running mate.
Although the economy and taxes have long been prominent issues in the campaign, the issue of ethics and anti-corruption efforts was thrust into the spotlight in July when several public officials were arrested on corruption charges in Operation Bid Rig.
One of Corzine's main lines of attack has involved Christie's ties to the unpopular former President of the United States George W. Bush, who appointed Christie to the U.S. Attorney's office in 2001. In August 2009, Bush political strategist Karl Rove revealed that he had held conversations with Christie about a potential gubernatorial run during Christie's time as U.S. Attorney. U.S. Attorneys are prohibited from engaging in partisan political activities by the Hatch Act of 1939. Corzine quickly incorporated this into his advertisements targeting Christie.

Lieutenant governor
On November 8, 2005, voters passed a Constitutional amendment to the New Jersey State Constitution which created the office of Lieutenant Governor of New Jersey, the first of whom is to be elected in the 2009 general election and to take office in January 2010. Until the creation of the office, governors who died in office or stepped down were succeeded by the President of the New Jersey Senate. This has happened twice in recent years, with the resignations of Christine Todd Whitman in 2001 and James McGreevey in 2004. Concerns over separation of powers (Acting Governors continued to serve concurrently in the Senate) and the fact that Acting Governors were not elected by the people to succeed the Governor led to the Constitutional amendment that created the new office. All 12 candidates for governor appearing on the ballot selected their running mates by the June 27, 2009 deadline.

Chris Christie, the Republican nominee for governor, selected Monmouth Beach's Kim Guadagno, the sheriff of Monmouth County, as his running mate. Others mentioned for the post had included New Jersey Senators Diane Allen and Jennifer Beck, as well as Bergen County Clerk Kathleen Donovan.

Incumbent Governor Jon Corzine, the Democratic nominee, selected Teaneck's Loretta Weinberg, a New Jersey Senator and former New Jersey General Assemblywoman, as his running mate. Other mentioned for the post had included New Jersey Senator Barbara Buono, New Jersey General Assemblywoman Bonnie Watson Coleman, and wealthy businessman Randal Pinkett.

Chris Daggett, an independent candidate who has qualified for matching funds, selected Ocean Township's Frank J. Esposito, a longtime professor and administrator at Kean University who served as an advisor to the Commissioner of Education in the Thomas Kean, Sr. administration, as his running mate. Others mentioned for the post had included Edison Mayor Jun Choi, Atlantic County freeholder Alisa Cooper, and Passaic County freeholder James Gallagher.

Legislature

Special elections
6th Legislative District: Sen. John Adler (D) resigned his seat to take office in the U.S. House of Representatives. He was replaced in a special election convention in January 2009 by then-Camden County Clerk James Beach. Beach will run in a special election in November to keep the seat for the rest of Adler's four-year term. He is being challenged by Republican Joseph Adolf, former mayor of Magnolia.

23rd Legislative District: Sen. Leonard Lance resigned his seat to take office in the U.S. House of Representatives. He was replaced in a special election convention in January 2009 by then-Assemblywoman Marcia A. Karrow, who was selected over Assemblyman Michael J. Doherty. Doherty declared his candidacy in the primary; he defeated Karrow in the Republican primary by approximately 1,000 votes, with 52% of those cast going to him. Doherty will now run against Democrat Harvey Baron, an orthopaedic surgeon, for the remainder of Lance's four-year term in the November special election.

Regularly scheduled elections

All 80 seats in the lower house of the legislature, the General Assembly, were up for election. Voters in each of New Jersey's 40 legislative districts elected two General Assemblymen. Two sitting General Assemblymen, Democrat L. Harvey Smith of the 31st Legislative District and Republican Daniel Van Pelt of the 9th Legislative District, were arrested on corruption charges on July 23, 2009. Van Pelt, who was arrested for accepting a $10,000 bribe, resigned from the Assembly and withdrew from his re-election bid on July 31. Smith was under pressure from the Democratic Party to resign, but did not; he is not seeking re-election. The scandal resulting from the arrests in Operation Bid Rig did not affect the legislative elections in 2009, as Democrats lost only 1 seat despite the rising Tea Party movement that led to Democratic Party defeats at the Governor's level and in Virginia on the same day.

Notable races and open seats
1st Legislative District: This district was considered a battleground in the 2009 General Assembly election. Incumbent Democrats Matthew Milam and Nelson Albano were seeking a second and third term respectively.  They were being challenged by 2007 candidate Michael Donohue, an attorney, and John McCann, a real estate agent in Ocean City who chaired that city's Republican committee. Upper Township Committeeman Frank Conrad was Donohue's running mate until June 20, 2009, when he withdrew from the race to focus on his highway safety equipment business. The GOP was vigorously pursuing the seats. Republican polling released on August 19 showed Republicans winning these Assembly seats in a generic ballot test, 48% to 29%. These were the only Democratic seats forecast as "Leans Republican" by PolitickerNJ.com.

3rd Legislative District: Democratic Assemblyman Doug Fisher resigned his seat in March 2009 to be sworn in as New Jersey Secretary of Agriculture. Fisher was replaced by Celeste Riley, previously a Bridgeton Council President. Surgeon Robert Villare and commercial oven repairman Lee Lucas won the Republican nomination over former Cumberland County surrogate and freeholder Arthur Marchand and Greenwich Township mayor George Shivery.  While the state GOP did not view Villare and Lucas as viable candidates, and Riley and fellow incumbent John J. Burzichelli were expected to win easily with PolitickerNJ.com forecasted these seats as "Safe Democratic," the race for the second seat was closer than anticipated, with Riley besting Villare by a little more than 1200 votes.

4th Legislative District: Democratic Assemblywoman Sandra Love announced that she would not run for a second term, citing health issues. The other incumbent assemblyman, Democrat Paul Moriarty, was running for re-election with new running mate Bill Collins, formerly of the Gloucester Township school board. Former Gloucester Township Councilman Eugene E.T. Lawrence, who served on the council as a Democrat, was nominated in the Republican primary, having switched parties to express his disdain for Governor Corzine's budget proposals. Dominick DiCicco of Franklinville, who was endorsed by Newt Gingrich in the primary, was the other Republican nominee. DiCicco is currently the Chief Legal Officer of North American Claim Operation for Zurich Financial Services. Lawrence and DiCicco defeated Andrew Savicky in the Republican primary. Republican polling released on August 19 showed Republicans winning these Assembly seats in a generic ballot test, 41% to 33%. However, PolitickerNJ.com had classified these seats as "Likely Democratic." Unofficial results show Moriarty being re-elected, with DiCicco defeating Collins by a little more than 1,000 votes.

5th Legislative District: Democratic Assemblywoman Nilsa Cruz-Perez is retiring after fourteen years in office. Camden City Council President Angel Fuentes was nominated in the Democratic primary to take her place on the ballot. Joe Roberts, a veteran assemblyman and the current Assembly Speaker, was also nominated in the June primary; however, on September 2, he announced that he would not be seeking re-election after all, saying at a state house press conference, "I think it’s, from my perspective, just time to take a break." Party leaders selected Fuentes's new running mate on September 12: labor leader Donald Norcross, who is also a Camden County Democratic Party co-chair and South Jersey political boss George Norcross's brother. The Republican nominees in this heavily Democratic district were Brian Kluchnick of Haddon Heights and Stepfanie Velez-Gentry of Bellmawr. PolitickerNJ.com forecasted these seats as "Safe Democratic.".Winners: Norcross & Fuentes
9th Legislative District: Republican Assemblyman Daniel Van Pelt resigned and withdrew from his re-election bid on July 31, after being indicted on corruption charges. He was replaced on the ballot by DiAnne Gove, the former mayor and a current commissioner of Long Beach Township.  Incumbent Republican Brian E. Rumpf was running for re-election. The Democratic nominees were attorneys Rich Visotcky of Stafford Township and Rob Rue of Tuckerton. PolitickerNJ.com forecasted these seats as "Safe Republican.".Winners: Rumpf & Gove
12th Legislative District: The Democratic Party was targeting freshmen Republican incumbents Declan O'Scanlon and Caroline Casagrande.  Democrats have a registration edge of 10,000 voters in the district. Former Manalapan Mayor and current township committeewoman Michelle Roth was running on a Democratic ticket with John Amberg of Tinton Falls, a teacher in the Irvington Public Schools. The Council on Affordable Housing is a major issue in the district, especially in towns like Marlboro, where Mayor Jon Hornik told Governor Corzine: "If you don’t kill COAH, it will kill my town." Casagrande and O'Scanlon both voted against the Democratic affordable housing bill in 2008; it passed anyway. Roth and Amberg did not take a stance on COAH on their website. Instead, they were campaigning on a platform of ending fiscal waste and improving government transparency. PolitickerNJ.com forecasted these seats as "Likely Republican.".Winners: Casagrande & O'Scanlon
14th Legislative District: Democratic incumbents Linda Greenstein and Wayne DeAngelo represent a district that elected a Republican, Bill Baroni, to the New Jersey Senate that same year. Because this district is heavily populated by unionized state workers, being pro-labor is considered a tremendous asset in this district. Republican gubernatorial nominee Chris Christie has supported the reduction of state workers to cut state spending, however; thus, alignment with Christie is something of a liability in this district. On the other hand, many state workers are also dissatisfied with Governor Corzine's imposition of unpaid furloughs and wage freezes. As a result of all of this, the district was considered highly competitive. The Republican challengers were Robert Calabro, a member of the Hamilton planning board who owns food markets and cafes in Hamilton and Trenton, and attorney William Harvey, also of Hamilton. Brian Hackett, a 21-year-old student activist at The College of New Jersey, was defeated in the primary. Gene Baldassari, who was added to the ballot by petition, was the first New Jersey candidate of the Modern Whig Party ever. Republican polling released on August 19 showed Republicans winning these Assembly seats in a generic ballot test, 47% to 36%. However, PolitickerNJ.com classified these seats as "Safe Democratic.".Winners: Greenstein & DeAngelo
19th Legislative District: Upon being indicted on corruption charges, Democratic Assemblyman Joseph Vas announced that he would not seek a second term. Jack O'Leary, longtime Mayor of South Amboy, took Vas's place on a ticket with incumbent Democrat John S. Wisniewski. However, dogged by a state investigation into his insurance business and intra-party pressure to bow out of the race, O'Leary ended his campaign on August 17. He was replaced on the ballot on September 2 by Craig Coughlin of Woodbridge, a retired municipal judge who currently serves as Woodbridge's municipal attorney and previously served as Carteret's borough attorney and as a South Amboy Councilman. Peter Kothari, an Indian-American businessman, was running on the GOP ticket with Perth Amboy real estate broker Richard Piatkowski, who ran for Congress in 2004. James Poesl, an environmental emergency response professional from Woodbridge, was running as an "Independent Conservative." Polling released on August 19 showed Republicans winning these Assembly seats in a generic ballot test, 46% to 31%. However, PolitickerNJ.com classified these seats as "Likely Democratic.">>.Winners: Wisniewski & Coughlin
20th Legislative District: Democratic Assemblyman Neil M. Cohen resigned on July 28, 2008, while under investigation by state authorities for possession of child pornography. (Cohen has since been indicted for official misconduct, possession of child pornography, and reproduction and distribution of child pornography.) Elizabeth attorney Annette Quijano was selected to complete Cohen's term in the Assembly; she ran for election to a term in her own right as the running mate of veteran Democratic Assemblyman and State Democratic Chairman Joseph Cryan of Union Township. Quijano and Cryan ran unopposed.Winners: Cryan & Quijano
21st Legislative District: Republican Assemblyman Eric Munoz died in office on March 30, 2009, at the age of 61. A special convention selected his widow, Nancy Munoz, as his successor. She then defeated Long Hill Township Mayor George Vitureira and Long Hill school board member Bruce Meringolo for the seat in the Republican primary. Former Cranford mayor Norman Albert and Springfield attorney Bruce Bergen ran on the Democratic ticket. The late Munoz's running mate, Republican Jon Bramnick, ran successfully for re-election; Nancy Munoz was elected to her first full term. PolitickerNJ.com forecast these seats as "Safe Republican."Winners: Bramnick & Munoz
23rd Legislative District: Republican Assemblywoman Marcia A. Karrow resigned her assembly seat to succeed newly elected U.S. Representative Leonard Lance in the New Jersey Senate. Karrow was replaced in the General Assembly by then-Warren County freeholder John DiMaio. The other assemblyman from this district, Michael J. Doherty, challenged Karrow in the Republican primary for the Senate seat and won, thus giving up his seat in the Assembly to run for Senate.  In the Republican primary for the assembly seats, DiMaio and Hunterdon County freeholder Erik Peterson narrowly won the nomination, edging Doherty's chief of staff, Edward Smith. The Democratic nominees in this overwhelmingly Republican district were William Courtney of Readington and Tammeisha Smith of Columbia; DiMaio and Peterson defeated them easily. PolitickerNJ.com forecast these seats as "Safe Republican."Winners: DiMaio & Peterson
25th Legislative District: Republican Assemblyman Rick Merkt decided to run for governor rather than seeking re-election to his seat. Attorney Tony Bucco, the son of New Jersey Senator Anthony Bucco, ran against Morris County freeholder Douglas Cabana for Merkt's seat in the Republican primary. Bucco defeated Cabana by less than 800 votes; putting him on a ticket with incumbent Republican Michael Patrick Carroll. The Democratic nominees in this district were Rebekah Conroy of Morristown and Wendy Wright of Boonton Township. Carroll and Bucco won easily in this Republican stronghold. PolitickerNJ.com forecast these seats as "Safe Republican."Winners: Bucco & Carroll
31st Legislative District: Democratic Assemblyman L. Harvey Smith did not seek re-election in 2009. Charles Mainor, a police detective from Jersey City, won the Democratic primary, defeating Ronnie Meadows and Monique Snow; putting him on a ticket with incumbent Democrat Anthony Chiappone. Since Smith's arrest on corruption charges in July, he has been under pressure from Democratic Party leaders to resign; if he does so, Mainor would probably be appointed to Smith's seat. Chiappone was indicted for theft by deception, among other charges, on August 26, but neither resigned nor withdrew from his re-election bid. The Republican nominees in this overwhelmingly Democratic district were attorney Irene Kim Asbury and health instructor Marie Day. PolitickerNJ.com forecast these seats as "Safe Democratic."Winners: Mainor & Chiappone Mainor and the indicted Chiappone both won the election.
36th Legislative District: Democratic incumbents Gary Schaer and Frederick Scalera were considered Republican targets. Schaer and Scalera were challenged by the same ticket that came very close to unseating them in the 2007 election:  Carlstadt school board member Don Diorio and real estate investment manager Carmen Pio Costa of Nutley. Diorio has said that if elected he would "vote independently, beholden to no political party and no special interest," while Pio Costa promised to stand up for the interests of suburbs by fighting for municipal aid reform. Schaer and Scalera have supported Governor Corzine's budget, which the GOP opposes, as well as the EnCap program which nearly lost them the election in 2007. PolitickerNJ.com ranked this pair of seats the second-most-vulnerable for Democrats.Winners: Scalera & Schaer Nevertheless, Schaer and Scalera were re-elected.
39th Legislative District: Republican Assemblyman John E. Rooney announced that he will retire after fourteen terms in office. Rooney and the party establishment both endorsed Bob Schroeder, longtime Washington Township councilman and two-time council president, for the seat. Schroeder ran on a ticket with veteran assemblywoman Charlotte Vandervalk; they defeated John Shahdanian, a labor attorney and the municipal chairman in Old Tappan, and Michael McCarthy, the political director of a stage hands' union, were running on the Democratic ticket. No Democrat has been elected by this district since 1977; PolitickerNJ.com forecast these seats as "Safe Republican."Winners: Vandervalk & Schroeder

Defeated incumbents

Incumbents defeated in primary election
Sen. Marcia A. Karrow, defeated in Republican primary in 23rd Legislative District.

Incumbents defeated in general election
Governor Jon S. Corzine.
No incumbents were defeated in the legislative races.

Open seat gains
The Republicans gained one open seat in the Assembly (Republican Domenick DiCicco of Franklinville replacing Democratic Assemblywoman Sandra Love – who did not seek re-election – in the 4th Legislative District).

See also
2009 New Jersey General Assembly elections

References

External links
Primary results, via NJ.com
Voter Registration Forms – Deadline to register is Tuesday, October 13.
 Polling Place Search
 Imagine Election – Find out about the people on your ballot, based on your zip code
PolitickerNJ.com's Battleground 2009 – Analysis of likely winners in each race

 
New Jersey